Lozzola  is a frazione of the commune of Berceto in the Emilia-Romagna region of Italy.

External links
 Parish Death Records 1646–1913 - from the Parish of San Lorenzo, villa Lozzola, comune Berceto, Parma,Italy

Frazioni of the Province of Parma
Berceto
Geography of Italy